Caspian Airlines Flight 7908 was a scheduled commercial flight from Tehran, Iran, to Yerevan, Armenia, that crashed near the village of Jannatabad, outside the city of Qazvin in north-western Iran, on 15 July 2009. All 153 passengers and 15 crew on board died.

The crash was the fourth deadliest aviation incident in Iran behind Iran Air Flight 655 (1988), the Iran Ilyushin Il-76 crash (2003), and Ukraine International Airlines Flight 752 (2020). It was also the second-deadliest aviation incident in 2009 behind Air France Flight 447.

The subsequent crash investigation found that the incident had been caused by fatigue failure and consequent disintegration of a rotor disc in the left hand engine (engine #1). In addition to the failure of that engine, fragments of the disc severed two of the three hydraulic control systems, and damaged fuel lines for the centre engine (engine #2). Fuel leaking from these damaged lines ignited, causing a large fire which then destroyed components that controlled the elevators and rudder, resulting in the pilots losing control of the aircraft.

Aircraft and crew

The aircraft was a Tupolev Tu-154M built in 1987 and operated by Iran's Caspian Airlines, according to a spokesman for Iran's aviation agency.

The crashed aircraft was registration EP-CPG, an aircraft which entered service on 20 April 1987 as YA-TAR for Bakhtar Afghan Airlines and was sold to Ariana Afghan Airlines in 1988. YA-TAR served with Ariana Afghan until sold to Caspian Airlines on 15 March 1998, 11 years after it was built. It was re-registered as EP-CPG in 1999.

The aircraft was checked for safety in June 2009 and was given flight licence until 2010. This was also stated by an Armenian aviation official, saying that the plane had gone through technical control in Mineralnye Vody Airport in southern Russia in June.

The flight crew consisted of captain Ali Asghar Shir Akbari, first officer Javad Masoumi Hesari, navigator Mahdi Firouse Souheil, and flight engineer Nima Salehie Rezve.

Accident

The aircraft crashed at 11:33 Iran Daylight Time (07:03 UTC), 16 minutes after takeoff from Tehran Imam Khomeini International Airport. According to authorities, the aircraft's tail suddenly caught on fire. The pilot circled, trying to find a safe spot to land, but without success. An eyewitness who claims to have been within  of the crash-site described the event as if "the plane just fell out of the sky". Three hours after the crash, fires over a  area still remained. A witness told Fars News Agency:

The aircraft's cockpit voice recorder and flight data recorder were found on 16 July. However, one of the "black boxes" was reported by Chief Investigator Ahmad Majidi to be damaged. Both flight recorders were successfully accessed, however, and contributed data to the accident investigation.

Passengers

Nationalities
It is reported that 38 (including two crew members) of the 168 passengers were Iranian nationals. 40 passengers were citizens of Armenia. There were also two Georgians on board, two Canadians, and two dual-national Iranian Australians. There were also two dual national Iranian-Americans.

Aftermath

Iranian president Mahmoud Ahmadinejad has expressed his sympathy for the deceased and their families.
Armenian President Serzh Sargsyan signed a decree on 15 July 2009 declaring the following day a Day of Mourning in Armenia.

Investigation

Armenian President Serzh Sargsyan announced on 15 July that a governmental commission had been set up to investigate the crash. It would be headed by Vice Prime Minister Armen Gevorgyan.

Iranian officials blamed the crash on technical reasons. It was claimed that the main reason of the accident was an engine failure and destruction due to a bird strike, which resulted in a fire which led to a loss of control and crash of the airplane.

On 23 December 2014 a chronology of events was published: During the climb to the altitude of  the crew sent a message about a fire in the number one engine. The aircraft was destroyed upon impact. The Commission found that it was the destruction of the low pressure compressor in the number one engine that scattered debris and damaged the fuselage and fuel lines causing the spread of a fast fire.

A final accident report was likely released by the Iranian authorities in 2011, although it did not come to wider attention until it was partially translated into English in 2019. The report found that the accident had been caused by fatigue failure of the first stage rotor of the low pressure compressor in engine No. 1, that resulted in the rotor disc disintegrating. Fragments from the rotor disc destroyed engine No. 1, severed the No. 1 and No. 3 hydraulic systems, and partially severed the fuel lines to engine No. 2. Hot components and hydraulic fluid ignited fuel spilling from the damaged fuel lines, and rapidly caused a large fire in the tail section of the plane. This fire, in turn, destroyed rods that actuated the rear control surfaces (elevators and rudder) resulting in the pilots losing control of the aircraft.

Prior to the accident the aircraft manufacturer, Tupolev, had released a service bulletin requiring more stringent testing of low pressure compressor components. However, this was only provided in Russian to Russian operators. Six days after the crash of EP-CPG, Tupolev released equivalent service bulletins to all operators.

See also

Aeroflot Flight 3519
Baikal Airlines Flight 130

References

External links 
 "Meeting Notes Moscow IAC July 6, 2010." (Archive) Iran Civil Aviation Organization.
Interstate Aviation Committee
 "Ту-154М EP-CPG 15.07.2009 ." (Alternate) (Archive)  – the Russian version is the work of record
"Ту-154М EP-CPG 15.07.2009."
 Full List of Victims (Archive)
 Tehran–Yerevan Flight 7908 Flight Crew & Passengers List – Caspian Airlines (Archive)
 Aircraft Database of EP-CPG Airframes.org
 Fatal Accident: Final List of Passengers On Board Flight CPN-7908, 15 July 2009 – General Department of Civil Aviation – Armenia (Archive)

Aviation accidents and incidents in 2009
2009 in Iran
Aviation accidents and incidents in Iran
Accidents and incidents by airline of Iran
Accidents and incidents involving the Tupolev Tu-154
Caspian Airlines accidents and incidents
Qazvin Province
July 2009 events in Asia
Airliner accidents and incidents caused by engine failure
Airliner accidents and incidents involving uncontained engine failure